Oxalis dehradunensis is a species of plant native to the Caribbean and Gulf Coast region. It is also found in India. It has a chromosome count of 2n=14.

References

External links

dehradunensis